The Rock Soldier CD is a five-song EP from Superdrag released by the Arena Rock Recording Co. in 2000. The liner notes of the CD includes a message to the listener from John Davis as follows:
Hello. If yer holding this you're pretty special. If not, you paid too much on eBay. These recordings were put together by Superdrag and The Arena Rock Recording Co. as a "thanks" to all the fans (i.e. "rock soldiers") who help light the way. Thanks for coming to the shows, playing our songs/requesting our songs, writing about us, putting up poster and buying the records. See you on the road. Come say "hi".

xo Superdrag and The Arena Rock Recording Co.

Track listing
All songs written by John Davis. Except "I Guess It's American" by John Davis/Adam Schlesinger
"Lighting the Way"
"I Guess It's American"
"She Says"
"My Day Will Come"
"The Emotional Kind"

Personnel
 John Davis – vocals, guitars
 Brandon Fisher – guitars
 Sam Powers – bass
 Don Coffey Jr. – drums

External links
Superdrag's official web site

Superdrag albums
2000 EPs